Malgosa is a surname. Notable people with the surname include:

Joaquim Malgosa (born 1963), Spanish field hockey player
Juan Malgosa (born 1959), Spanish field hockey player
Santiago Malgosa (born 1956), Spanish field hockey player